Fraternité may refer to:

 Fraternité (film), a 1954 French comedy TV film
 French frigate Fraternité, formerly the Aglaé

See also
 Fraternity (disambiguation)